Unleashed from the Pleasuredome is the first live album from English singer-songwriter Holly Johnson, released by Abbey Road Live Here Now in 2014.

Background
With the release of his first album in 15 years, 2014's Europa, Johnson announced his first UK solo tour in October of that year, named after what Johnson described as "the most upbeat song on the Europa album"; "Dancing with No Fear". The tour, which was Johnson's first since the final Frankie Goes to Hollywood shows in 1987, marked the 30th anniversary of the release of the band's debut album Welcome to the Pleasuredome. Speaking of the tour, Johnson revealed, "Since performing at festivals each summer here in the UK, I realised how enjoyable it is to sing the songs that I have written, and look forward to performing material from my new album. I'm really excited to be able to play songs that written throughout my career. Being able to tour as a solo artist in the 21st Century with a back catalogue and new material is a very privileged position to be in."

On 28 October 2014, Johnson played live at Koko venue in London, which was the last night of the UK tour. The show was recorded for the release of a live album, which was released in December. The album contains nineteen tracks, and is a mixture of Johnson's solo tracks and Frankie Goes to Hollywood songs. In a 2015 interview, Johnson was asked if the recording of the Koko show was pre-planned. He replied, "It was midway, actually, as the tour continued to Germany. It was a good show to record actually as by the time I got to Cologne in December I developed Laryngitis which was unfortunate."

Release
Unleashed From the Pleasuredome was released as a digital download and as a two-disc CDr album in the UK and Europe by Abbey Road Live Here Now. The CDr version was packaged in a 6-panel digisleeve, with the front sleeve being a painting by Johnson. The album was made available online at Abbey Road Live, and also sold at future live shows. A limited stock of the CDr was also made available later via Johnson's official website store. The label is operated by the UK-based Live Here Now team, who professionally capture live concert shows and produces copies for purchase as CD-R packages.

Track listing

Personnel
 Holly Johnson – vocals
 Kristin Hosein – backing vocals
 Lyndon Connah – keyboards, backing vocals
 Rob Hughes – keyboards, flute, saxophone, backing vocals
 Pete Rinaldi – guitar, accordion, backing vocals
 Richard Brook (MD) – drums

Additional personnel
 Ian Duncan, Rob Brinkmann – recording
 Gary Langan – front of house engineer
 Julian Bishop – monitor engineer
 Claire Murphy, Jerry Eddison, Lewis Young – backline technicians
 Elspeth Hughes – systems technician
 Necker – mixing
 Martin Nicholas – lighting director
 Nikki Eede – tour manager
 Philip Marshall – design
 Rebecca Thomas – live photography
 Holly Johnson – painting

References

2014 live albums
Holly Johnson albums